Dominator is the twelfth studio album by German heavy metal band U.D.O., released via AFM Records on 21 August 2009.

A music video was released for the song "Black and White".

Track listing

Charts
Album

Personnel
Udo Dirkschneider: vocals
Stefan Kaufmann: guitar, piano
Igor Gianola: guitar
Fitty Wienhold: bass, piano
Francesco Jovino: drums

Additional musicians
Mathias Dieth: lead guitars on "Devil's Rendezvous"

References

2009 albums
U.D.O. albums
AFM Records albums